Nicole Harris (born 16 July 1992) is an Australian Paralympic athlete with intellectual disability and mild cerebral palsy. She represented Australia at the 2016 Rio Paralympics in athletics.

Personal
Harris was born on 16 July 1992 in Hurstville, New South Wales with an intellectual impairment and cerebral palsy. She attended Danebank Anglican School for Girls. In 2016, she works at Danebank School and Caringbah YMCA.

Athletics
Harris was initially a 1500m runner but changed to throwing events after a coach suggested that she might be successful due to her long limbs. She is classified as a F20 athlete. At the 2013 IPC Athletics World Championships, she finished 6th in the Women's Shot Put F20. At the 2015 IPC Athletics World Championships, she finished 7th in the Women's Shot Put F20.

At the 2016 Rio Paralympics Harris competed in the F20 Shot put event ranking 7th overall.

References

External links
 
 
 Nicole Harris at Australian Athletics Historical Results

Paralympic athletes of Australia
Athletes (track and field) at the 2016 Summer Paralympics
1992 births
Living people
Australian female shot putters